The Golymin was a 74-gun ship of the line of the French Navy (of the Duquesne sub-class). Built in Lorient in 1804, she was launched in 1809. Wrecked on Mengam Rock in the roads of Brest on 23 March 1814, she is the source of the Obusier de vaisseau currently on display in the Musée national de la Marine in Paris and in Brest.

Career 
She was commissioned under Captain Amand Leduc on 1 January 1812, taking part in Allemand's escape from Lorient in March.

On 23 March 1814, Golymin was despatched from Brest to assist two frigates inbound for the harbour, but a gust of wind pushed her on Mengam Rock, where she was wrecked and sank. The crew managed to abandon ship in good order and was ferried ashore by boats without loss of life. Leduc was court-martialled and found innocent of the loss of the ship on 15 July 1814.

The wreck was discovered in 1977 by Michèle and Jean-Marie Retornaz, and explored by the DRASSM in 1980.

Sources and references

References

Sources 
 

Ships of the line of the French Navy
Téméraire-class ships of the line
1809 ships